"Still Life" is the first segment of the fourteenth episode from the first season (1985–86) of the second version of the television series The Twilight Zone. It was John Carradine's final television appearance before his death in 1988. The plot follows a photographer and his wife who discover an old camera which contains the essences of violent Amazonians from the early 20th century.

Plot
Photographer Daniel brings home an antique trunk for his wife Becky. He discovers a false bottom in the trunk that conceals a Kodak Brownie 100 camera. Upon developing the photos, he discovers that they are of a 1913 National Geographic expedition to the Amazon. He decides to donate the photos to the local university. At the university, he meets Professor Stottel, who was on the expedition. Stottel tells Daniel that there could be no photos because the Kurucai tribe they met in the Amazon felt that making any image of them was stealing their souls, so they smashed the camera, stalked the expedition, and abducted the photographer. Daniel says the photographer must have concealed this second camera in the false bottom before he was abducted. Professor Stottel looks at the pictures and confirms they are genuine. However, the Kurucai who should be in the photos are missing.

Daniel returns home to find the missing Kurucai inside his home. When the tribesmen attack them, Daniel and his wife use their cameras to recapture the Kurucai on film.

External links
 
 

1986 American television episodes
The Twilight Zone (1985 TV series season 1) episodes

fr:Images vivantes